The Loomis Homestead in Windsor, Connecticut, is one of the oldest timber-frame houses in America. The oldest part of the house, an ell adjacent to the main house, is believed to have been built between 1640 and 1653 by Joseph Loomis who came to America from England in 1638. Later additions to the Loomis house were made around the turn of the eighteenth century.  The preserved house is now adjacent to the well-known Loomis Chaffee School, which was founded by Loomis' descendants who donated the surrounding farm land of the original homestead for the grounds of the school.

References

Houses completed in 1640
Houses in Windsor, Connecticut
Houses on the National Register of Historic Places in Connecticut
Georgian architecture in Connecticut
National Register of Historic Places in Hartford County, Connecticut
1640 establishments in Connecticut